Punitz-Güssing Airport is a private use airport located near Punitz, Burgenland, Austria.

See also
List of airports in Austria

References

External links 
 Airport record for Punitz-Güssing Airport at Landings.com

Airports in Austria
Burgenland